Tineke "Trijntje" Fopma (born 21 July 1953) is a retired Dutch cyclist who was active between 1973 and 1981. She won the road race at the 1975 UCI Road World Championships.

References

1953 births
Living people
Dutch female cyclists
People from Littenseradiel
UCI Road World Champions (women)
UCI Road World Championships cyclists for the Netherlands
Cyclists from Friesland